Juniores do Sport Lisboa e Benfica are the under-19 team of Portuguese football club S.L. Benfica. They hold home matches at Benfica Campus, the club's training ground and youth academy in Seixal.

Benfica's under-19s have won a record 25 Campeonato Nacional de Juniores (current champions), one Blue Stars/FIFA Youth Cup (1996), one UEFA Youth League (2021–22) and one Under-20 Intercontinental Cup (2022). Benfica hold UEFA Youth League records for the biggest win in a final, 6–0 against Red Bull Salzburg, most final appearances (4, joint-record with Chelsea) and most games played (70). They were distinguished for "Best implementation of the UEFA Youth League values" in 2013–14.

There are other development teams below under-19, completing Benfica's youth system: Juvenis "A" and "B"; Iniciados "A" and "B"; Infantis "A", "B", "C" and "D"; Benjamins "A" and "B"; and Traquinas "A". In 2015, Benfica received the Globe Soccer award for Best Academy of the year.

Players

Current players

Key
B = current Benfica B player

Notable players

The following is a list of players who (have) represented Benfica's first-team in a minimum of 25 matches, or (have) reached 25 caps at full international level while at Benfica or another club. Over 1,000 players have come through Benfica's youth ranks, but only a small part of them played for the main team. In some occasions, graduates debuted for the first-team but left Benfica before reaching 25 matches and went on representing their national team at full international level. Those who meet the aforementioned criteria are listed below. (Time periods below correspond to when players joined Benfica youth.)

Pre-1960
 Albino
 Santana
 Humberto Fernandes
 António Mendes
 Serra
 Fernando Cruz
 José Henrique
 Simões

1960s
 Diamantino Costa
 Vítor Martins
 Artur Correia
 Nené
 Humberto Coelho
 João Alves

1970s
 António Bastos Lopes
 Shéu
 Rui Jordão
 Eurico Gomes
 Cavungi
 Alberto Fonseca
 Fernando Chalana
 José Luís
 Jorge Silva
 Diamantino
 Rui Costa

1980s
 Samuel
 António Fonseca
 José Carlos
 Kenedy
 Paulo Sousa
 Paulo Madeira
 Rui Bento
 Bruno Basto
 Maniche

1990s
 Pedro Henriques
 Edgar
 Hugo Leal
 Bruno Aguiar
 José Sousa
 João Pereira
 Diogo Luís
 Sílvio
 Manuel Fernandes
 José Moreira

2000s
 Miguel Vítor
 Bernardo Silva
 Nélson Oliveira
 Gonçalo Guedes
 Bruno Varela
 Renato Sanches
 João Cancelo
 Jota
 Diogo Gonçalves
 Rúben Dias
 Ederson
 Gedson Fernandes

2010s
 Florentino
 André Gomes
 Ferro
 Victor Lindelöf
 Gonçalo Ramos
 João Félix
 Nuno Tavares

Coaching staff

Competitive record

UEFA Youth League

Note: Benfica score is always listed first.

Honours
 Portuguese Championship
 Winners (25) – record: 1943–44, 1944–45, 1948–49, 1950–51, 1954–55, 1956–57, 1957–58, 1958–59, 1959–60, 1961–62, 1962–63, 1967–68, 1969–70, 1971–72, 1974–75, 1975–76, 1977–78, 1984–85, 1987–88, 1988–89, 1999–00, 2003–04, 2012–13, 2017–18, 2021–22
 Blue Stars/FIFA Youth Cup
 Winners: 1996
 UEFA Youth League
 Winners: 2021–22
 Under-20 Intercontinental Cup
 Winners – record: 2022

Other youth honours
Juvenis (under-17)
 Portuguese Championship
 Winners (19): 1963–64, 1967–68, 1968–69, 1973–74, 1974–75, 1982–83, 1989–90, 1990–91, 1991–92, 1992–93, 1995–96, 1996–97, 2000–01, 2007–08, 2010–11, 2012–13, 2014–15, 2017–18, 2018–19

Iniciados (under-15)
 Portuguese Championship
 Winners (10): 1978–79, 1981–82, 1984–85, 1988–89, 2008–09, 2009–10, 2011–12, 2013–14, 2015–16, 2016–17

Infantis (under-13)
 Portuguese Championship
 Winners (3) - shared record: 1988–89, 1989–90, 1995–96

References

External links
 Departamento de Formação 
 How Benfica became a global figurehead in player development – These Football Times (2017)

Youth
1904 establishments in Portugal
Football academies in Portugal
Youth football in Portugal
UEFA Youth League teams